Job-shop scheduling, the job-shop problem (JSP) or job-shop scheduling problem (JSSP) is an optimization problem in computer science and operations research. It is a variant of optimal job scheduling. In a general job scheduling problem, we are given n jobs J1, J2, ..., Jn of varying processing times, which need to be scheduled on m machines with varying processing power, while trying to minimize the makespan – the total length of the schedule (that is, when all the jobs have finished processing). In the specific variant known as job-shop scheduling, each job consists of a set of operations O1, O2, ..., On which need to be processed in a specific order (known as precedence constraints). Each operation has a specific machine that it needs to be processed on and only one operation in a job can be processed at a given time. A common relaxation is the flexible job shop, where each operation can be processed on any machine of a given set (the machines in each set are identical).

The name originally came from the scheduling of jobs in a job shop, but the theme has wide applications beyond that type of instance. This problem is one of the best known combinatorial optimization problems, and was the first problem for which competitive analysis was presented, by Graham in 1966. Best problem instances for basic model with makespan objective are due to Taillard.

In the standard three-field notation for optimal job scheduling problems, the job-shop variant is denoted by J in the first field. For example, the problem denoted by " J3||" is a 3-machines job-shop problem with unit processing times, where the goal is to minimize the maximum completion time.

Problem variations 
Many variations of the problem exist, including the following:
 Machines can have duplicates (flexible job shop with duplicate machines) or belong to groups of identical machines (flexible job shop).
 Machines can require a certain gap between jobs or no idle-time.
 Machines can have sequence-dependent setups.
 Objective function can be to minimize the makespan, the Lp norm, tardiness, maximum lateness etc. It can also be multi-objective optimization problem.
 Jobs may have constraints, for example a job i needs to finish before job j can be started (see workflow). Also, the objective function can be multi-criteria.
 Set of jobs can relate to different set of machines.
 Deterministic (fixed) processing times or probabilistic processing times.

NP-hardness
Since the traveling salesman problem is NP-hard, the job-shop problem with sequence-dependent setup is clearly also NP-hard since the TSP is a special case of the JSP with a single job (the cities are the machines and the salesman is the job).

Problem representation 

The disjunctive graph is one of the popular models used for describing the job-shop scheduling problem instances.

A mathematical statement of the problem can be made as follows:

Let  and  be two finite sets.

Let  denote the set of all sequential assignments of jobs to machines, such that every job is done by every machine exactly once; elements  may be written as  matrices, in which column  lists the jobs that machine  will do, in order. For example, the matrix

 

means that machine  will do the three jobs  in the order , while machine  will do the jobs in the order .

Suppose also that there is some cost function . The cost function may be interpreted as a "total processing time", and may have some expression in terms of times , the cost/time for machine  to do job .

The job-shop problem is to find an assignment of jobs  such that  is a minimum, that is, there is no  such that .

Scheduling efficiency
Scheduling efficiency can be defined for a schedule through the ratio of total machine idle time to the total processing time as below:

Notice that with the above definition, scheduling efficiency is simply the makespan normalized to the number of machines and the total processing time. This makes it possible to compare the usage of resources across JSP instances of different size.

The problem of infinite cost
One of the first problems that must be dealt with in the JSP is that many proposed solutions have infinite cost: i.e., there exists  such that . In fact, it is quite simple to concoct examples of such  by ensuring that two machines will deadlock, so that each waits for the output of the other's next step.

Major results 
Graham had already provided the List scheduling algorithm in 1966, which is -competitive, where m is the number of machines.  Also, it was proved that List scheduling is optimum online algorithm for 2 and 3 machines. The Coffman–Graham algorithm (1972) for uniform-length jobs is also optimum for two machines, and is -competitive. In 1992, Bartal, Fiat, Karloff and Vohra presented an algorithm that is 1.986 competitive.  A 1.945-competitive algorithm was presented by Karger, Philips and Torng in 1994.  In 1992, Albers provided a different algorithm that is 1.923-competitive. Currently, the best known result is an algorithm given by Fleischer and Wahl, which achieves a competitive ratio of 1.9201.

A lower bound of 1.852 was presented by Albers.
Taillard instances has an important role in developing job-shop scheduling with makespan objective.

In 1976 Garey provided a proof that this problem is NP-complete for m>2, that is, no optimal solution can be computed in deterministic polynomial time for three or more machines (unless P=NP).

In 2011 Xin Chen et al. provided optimal algorithms for online scheduling on two related machines improving previous results.

Offline makespan minimization

Atomic jobs 

The simplest form of the offline makespan minimisation problem deals with atomic jobs, that is, jobs that are not subdivided into multiple operations. It is equivalent to packing a number of items of various different sizes into a fixed number of bins, such that the maximum bin size needed is as small as possible. (If instead the number of bins is to be minimised, and the bin size is fixed, the problem becomes a different problem, known as the bin packing problem.)

Dorit S. Hochbaum and David Shmoys presented a polynomial-time approximation scheme in 1987 that finds an approximate solution to the offline makespan minimisation problem with atomic jobs to any desired degree of accuracy.

Jobs consisting of multiple operations 
The basic form of the problem of scheduling jobs with multiple (M) operations, over M machines, such that all of the first operations must be done on the first machine, all of the second operations on the second, etc., and a single job cannot be performed in parallel, is known as the flow-shop scheduling problem. Various algorithms exist, including genetic algorithms.

Johnson's algorithm

A heuristic algorithm by S. M. Johnson can be used to solve the case of a 2 machine N job problem when all jobs are to be processed in the same order.  The steps of algorithm are as follows:

Job Pi has two operations, of duration Pi1, Pi2, to be done on Machine M1, M2 in that sequence.

Step 1. List A = { 1, 2, …, N }, List L1 = {}, List L2 = {}.
Step 2. From all available operation durations, pick the minimum.

If the minimum belongs to Pk1,

Remove K from list A; Add K to end of List L1.

If minimum belongs to Pk2,

Remove K from list A; Add K to beginning of List L2.

Step 3. Repeat Step 2 until List A is empty.
Step 4. Join List L1, List L2. This is the optimum sequence.

Johnson's method only works optimally for two machines. However, since it is optimal, and easy to compute, some researchers have tried to adopt it for M machines, (M > 2.)

The idea is as follows: Imagine that each job requires m operations in sequence, on M1, M2 … Mm. We combine the first m/2 machines into an (imaginary) Machining center, MC1, and the remaining Machines into a Machining Center MC2. Then the total processing time for a Job P on MC1 = sum( operation times on first m/2 machines), and processing time for Job P on MC2 = sum(operation times on last m/2 machines).

By doing so, we have reduced the m-Machine problem into a Two Machining center scheduling problem. We can solve this using Johnson's method.

Makespan prediction 
Machine learning has been recently used to predict the optimal makespan of a JSP instance without actually producing the optimal schedule. Preliminary results show an accuracy of around 80% when supervised machine learning methods were applied to classify small randomly generated JSP instances based on their optimal scheduling efficiency compared to the average.

Example 

Here is an example of a job-shop scheduling problem formulated in AMPL as a mixed-integer programming problem with indicator constraints:
param N_JOBS;
param N_MACHINES;

set JOBS ordered = 1..N_JOBS;
set MACHINES ordered = 1..N_MACHINES;

param ProcessingTime{JOBS, MACHINES} > 0;

param CumulativeTime{i in JOBS, j in MACHINES} =
   sum {jj in MACHINES: ord(jj) <= ord(j)} ProcessingTime[i,jj];

param TimeOffset{i1 in JOBS, i2 in JOBS: i1 <> i2} =
   max {j in MACHINES}
     (CumulativeTime[i1,j] - CumulativeTime[i2,j] + ProcessingTime[i2,j]);

var end >= 0;
var start{JOBS} >= 0;
var precedes{i1 in JOBS, i2 in JOBS: ord(i1) < ord(i2)} binary;

minimize makespan: end;

subj to makespan_def{i in JOBS}:
   end >= start[i] + sum{j in MACHINES} ProcessingTime[i,j];

subj to no12_conflict{i1 in JOBS, i2 in JOBS: ord(i1) < ord(i2)}:
   precedes[i1,i2] ==> start[i2] >= start[i1] + TimeOffset[i1,i2];

subj to no21_conflict{i1 in JOBS, i2 in JOBS: ord(i1) < ord(i2)}:
   !precedes[i1,i2] ==> start[i1] >= start[i2] + TimeOffset[i2,i1];

data;

param N_JOBS := 4;
param N_MACHINES := 4;

param ProcessingTime:
1 2 3 4 :=
1 4 2 1
2 3 6 2
3 7 2 3
4 1 5 8;

Related problems 

 Flow-shop scheduling is a similar problem but without the constraint that each operation must be done on a specific machine (only the order constraint is kept).
 Open-shop scheduling is a similar problem but also without the order constraint.

See also 

 Disjunctive graph
 Dynamic programming
 Genetic algorithm scheduling
 List of NP-complete problems
 Optimal control
 Scheduling (production processes)

References

External links 
 University of Vienna Directory of methodologies, systems and software for dynamic optimization.
 Taillard instances
 Brucker P. Scheduling Algorithms. Heidelberg, Springer. Fifth ed. 

Optimal scheduling

pt:Escalonamento de Job Shop